Nubl al-Khatib (also spelled Nabl al-Khatib, also known as Harat al-Khatib and Nubl al-Tahtani), is a village in northern Syria, located in the Shathah Subdistrict of the al-Suqaylabiyah District in Hama Governorate. According to the Syria Central Bureau of Statistics (CBS), it had a population of 2,381 in the 2004 census. Its inhabitants are predominantly Alawites.

References 

Alawite communities in Syria
Populated places in al-Suqaylabiyah District
Populated places in al-Ghab Plain